The 1986–87 Segunda División B season was the 10th since its establishment. The first matches of the season were played on 30 August 1986, and the season ended on 14 June 1987.

Overview before the season
22 teams joined the league, including four relegated from the 1985–86 Segunda División and 6 promoted from the 1985–86 Tercera División.

Relegated from Segunda División
Albacete
Deportivo Aragón
Tenerife
Atlético Madrid B

Promoted from Tercera División

Lugo
Mallorca Atlético
Polideportivo Almería
Gandía
Alzira
Eibar

Teams

League table

Results

Top goalscorers

Top goalkeepers

Segunda División B seasons
3
Spain